Raymond Gérard (born 4 June 1914) was a Belgian basketball player. He competed in the men's tournament at the 1936 Summer Olympics.

References

External links
 

1914 births
Year of death missing
Belgian men's basketball players
Olympic basketball players of Belgium
Basketball players at the 1936 Summer Olympics
Place of birth missing